The Canton of Aubagne-Ouest is a canton located within the administrative department of Bouches-du-Rhône in southern France. It was created 27 February 2003 by the decree 2003-156 of that date. It had 41,357 inhabitants (2012). It was disbanded following the French canton reorganisation which came into effect in March 2015. It consisted of 2 communes, which joined the new canton of Aubagne in 2015.

Elected to represent the canton in the General Council of Bouches-du-Rhône'' : 
 Daniel Fontaine (PC, 2001-2008)

Area
It was composed of the western half of Aubagne not included in the Canton of Aubagne-Est as well as the commune of La Penne-sur-Huveaune.

See also 
 Arrondissement of Marseille
 Cantons of the Bouches-du-Rhône department
 Communes of the Bouches-du-Rhône department

References

Aubagne-Ouest
2003 establishments in France
2015 disestablishments in France
States and territories disestablished in 2015